John Cutting may refer to:

 John Cutting (psychiatrist), British psychiatrist and writer
 John T. Cutting (1844–1911), U.S. Representative
John Cutting (MP) for Orford (UK Parliament constituency)

See also
Jack Cutting (disambiguation)